Calochilus praealtus, commonly known as the lofty beard orchid, is a species of orchid endemic to the Northern Tablelands of New South Wales. It has a single pale green leaf and up to six pale green flowers with faint red stripes and a labellum with a dark purple beard. It is only known from two mountainous areas.

Description
The leaf has a powdery coating and a purplish red base. Individual flowers last for between two and four days. The lateral sepals are a similar length but only about half as wide and spread apart from each other. The column has two yellowish "eyes" joined by a faint ridge. Flowering occurs from December to February but the flowers only last between two and four days.

Taxonomy and naming
Calochilus praealtus was first formally described in 2006 by David Jones from a specimen collected in Mount Kaputar National Park and the description was published in Australian Orchid Research. The specific epithet (praealtus) is a Latin word meaning "very high".

Jones gave the species the name Calochilus praeltus, misspelling the Greek word and mentioning that its meaning is "high altitude, elevation; in reference to its occurrence at high altitudes". The misspelling has been copied by the Australian Plant Name Index.

Distribution and habitat
The lofty beard orchid grows with grasses in snow gum woodland. It is only known from Barrington Tops and the Mount Kaputar National Park.

References

praealtus
Flora of New South Wales
Endemic orchids of Australia
Plants described in 2006